Saad Al Aamer is a Bahraini international footballer who plays for Riffa and Bahrain national football team. He played for Budaiya.

International goals 
Scores and results list Bahrain's goal tally first.

References 

Living people
Bahraini footballers
Bahrain international footballers
Year of birth missing (living people)

Association football forwards